On Safari is a British children's game show that aired on ITV from 16 February 1982 to 11 December 1984 and is hosted by Christopher Biggins and co-hosted by Gillian Taylforth.

Gameplay
Each week two teams (three in the first series) consisting of a child and their parent (a celebrity in the third and fourth series) played in a series of games in different jungle settings (i.e. swamps, venus fly traps etc.) and the team with the most points at the end of the show were the winners. The child from the winning team won a major prize, while the losing children went away with consolation prizes.

Transmissions

Series

Special

References

External links
 

1980s British children's television series
1980s British game shows
1982 British television series debuts
1984 British television series endings
British children's game shows
English-language television shows
ITV children's television shows
Television series about children
Television shows produced by Television South (TVS)